Events in the year 1967 in Spain.

Incumbents
Caudillo: Francisco Franco

Events 

 4 May: Alicante–Elche Miguel Hernández Airport was founded
 1967 Volta a Catalunya

Births

January 1 - Juanma Bajo Ulloa.
March 24 - David Freixa.
April 4 - Sergio Valdeolmillos.
July 28 - Lucas Mondelo.

Deaths

March 21 - Ramón Encinas. (b. 1893)
April 27 - Manolo Morán. (b. 1905)

See also
 List of Spanish films of 1967

References

 
Years of the 20th century in Spain
1960s in Spain
Spain
Spain